Le Feuvre & Roze is a contemporary art gallery in Paris.

The gallery represents a significant number of artists of different nationalities in France.

History 
The gallery was founded by Franck Le Feuvre as 'Le Feuvre Gallery'. In 2016, Jonathan Roze became its director, and in 2018, Roze became a partner in the enterprise, with the accompanying name change to 'Le Feuvre & Roze'. The gallery  has a second showroom at 178 Rue du Faubourg Saint-Honoré.

Associated artists and collaborations 
The current artists represented by the gallery: 

 Adrian Falkner
 Ella & Pitr 
 Jan Kolata
 Mist
 Sixe Paredes
 Sowat
 Christoph Häßler (Stohead)
 Julien Colombier

Exhibitions 
Since 2005, the gallery has regularly displayed individual and collective exhibitions of its clients, such as four JonOne exhibitions between 2008 - 2016 and also two exhibitions of Invader: 1000 in 2011 and Masterpieces in 2017.

All of the associated artists have an individual exhibition every two or three years.

Recent exhibitions: Adrian Falkner: Cold Fever, 2018; Jan Kolata : Grands Formats, 2018; and Ella & Pitr : Comme des fourmis. 2018;

References

External links 
 

8th arrondissement of Paris
Contemporary art galleries in France